Medicine Magazine was a UK consumer magazine focused on health and medical issues. It had a more serious medical and scientific editorial than women's magazines.

The magazine was the first consumer magazine in the UK to cover in detail and compare prescription medications and surgical treatments. It also published some articles and news on its website. It ended publication on 19 June 2012.

References

External links
 Corporate website

2007 establishments in the United Kingdom
2012_disestablishments_in_the_United_Kingdom
Science and technology magazines published in the United Kingdom
Bi-monthly magazines published in the United Kingdom
Defunct magazines published in the United Kingdom
Magazines established in 2007
Magazines disestablished in 2012
Medical magazines